Ichneutica virescens is a moth of the family Noctuidae. It is endemic to New Zealand, and is found in the southern North Island and throughout the South Island. The species is found in alpine, sub-alpine, and down to sea-level in grassland habitats. Adults are on the wing from November through to April. The likely larval host may be grasses, but larvae have been reared on a range of plants. The adults are similar to I. panda, I. falsidica and I. nobilia, but is distinguished by size, wing colouration, and antennae formation.

Taxonomy 
This species was described by Arthur Gardiner Butler in 1879 from an unspecified number of specimens obtained from Frederick Hutton at the Otago Museum and collected from Otago. Butler originally named the species Chera virescens. The holotype specimen is a female held at the Natural History Museum, London.

In earlier literature the species is known as Leucania griseipennis or Aletia griseipennis as a result of Edward Meyrick incorrectly interpreting the name griseipennis Felder & Rogenhofer. J. S. Dugdale, in his catalogue of New Zealand Lepidoptera, revised the incorrect synonymy given by Meyrick and placed this species within the Aletia genus. In 2019 Robert Hoare undertook a major review of New Zealand Noctuidae. During this review the genus Ichneutica was greatly expanded and the genus Aletia was subsumed into that genus as a synonym. As a result of this review, this species is now known as Ichneutica viriscens.

Description 
 
Butler described the species as follows:

The wingspan of the female of this species is between 40 and 49 mm and for the male is between 42 and 46 mm. I. virescens is similar in appearance to I. panda and I. falsidica,  although both these latter species are smaller in size. The forewing markings of I. virescens are "much more distinct" than in I. nobilia. Fresh specimens can be distinguished from the smaller I. panda through the scaling of the inner edge of the subterminal line. This scaling has three patches in I. virescens, which are absent I. panda. I. falsidica can be distinguished by the pectinations of the male antennae, and by colour differences in the wing.

Distribution 
It is endemic to New Zealand. It is found in the southern North Island and throughout the South Island, but is not known from any offshore islands. George Hudson described it as very common on Mount Taranaki, and extremely abundant on the lower slopes of Mount Aurum in Otago and at up to around  altitude at Mount Earnslaw / Pikirakatahi.

Habitat 
This species is known from grassland habitat.

Behaviour 
The larvae are likely to pupate under rocks. Adults of this species are on the wing from November to April, although most observations have been in the January to March period. Generally nocturnal, it is known to sometimes fly by day.

Life history and host species 

George Hudson describes the egg as approximately 0.8mm, and pale yellowish white. The adult larvae are about 38mm long, with a light green shiny head and a body which is "very vivid green, paler and bluer underneath", with a "conspicuous yellowish sub-dorsal line and a broad white lateral line".

Hudson described the larva as "no doubt" feeding on native grasses, although Hoare reports that this is not accepted by White, and that the host-range of the larvae requires further investigation. Larval specimens have been reared on Epilobium, Coriaria plumosa, and Blechnaceae ferns.

References 

Moths described in 1879
Moths of New Zealand
Endemic fauna of New Zealand
Taxa named by Arthur Gardiner Butler
Hadeninae
Endemic moths of New Zealand